Watts Branch is a stream in Audrain County in the U.S. state of Missouri. It is a tributary of the South Fork of the Salt River.

Watts Branch has the name of George Watta, a local pioneer.

See also
List of rivers of Missouri

References

Rivers of Audrain County, Missouri
Rivers of Missouri